Sufi Mufti Azangachi Saheb(R.A) (1828 – 19 December 1932) was a Bengali Sufi saint who founded the Haqqani Anjuman, a non-governmental Sufi organisation. Haqqani Anjuman established by Hazrat Maulana Sufi Mufti Azangachi (R.A) is a non profit sufi organization. Sufi Azangachi (R.A) established this darbar for muslims of this world who are mislead by current ulema and mufits about true islam. Haqqani Anjuman of Sufi Azangachi (R.A) upholds the true spirit of Islam by preaching the exact teachings of Allah (S.W.T) which our Prophet Muhammad (S.A.W) preached.

Biography
He was born in 1828 to a Bengali Muslim family in the village of Azangachhi, Howrah District. His father, Raqibuddin Ahmad Faruqi, was a local mufti. The Saheb died on 19 December 1932 in the Bagmari area of Calcutta, Bengal Province.

References

External links
 

1828 births
1932 deaths
Indian Sufis
People from West Bengal
Haqqani Anjuman
20th-century Bengalis
19th-century Bengalis
People from Howrah district
Hanafis